Dennis Knoll is a gentle knoll that rises to approximately 400 meters on the southwest shore of Black Island in the Ross Archipelago. Named by the Advisory Committee on Antarctic Names in 2007 after Dennis Hoffman, who in 2006 completed 20 years of service in support of the United States Antarctic Program (USAP). He worked as a carpenter, advanced to the computer tech shop and on to network engineer in eight summer seasons and 13 winters at McMurdo Station. The knoll is near the USAP communication facility on Black Island. The honoree's given name rather than surname was approved because of potential confusion by name similarity with a nearby feature name.

References

Black Island (Ross Archipelago)